Wan'an is a town under the administration of Jiangle County, Fujian, China. , it has one residential community, 8 villages, and one stock farm area under its administration.

References 

Township-level divisions of Fujian
Jiangle County